Ateam Inc. is a provider of mobile content and websites based in Nagoya, Japan.

 has three primary divisions:  Lifestyle Support Business, Entertainment Business and E-Commerce Business.

The Lifestyle Support Business engages in the planning, development and operation of various online services that allow users to gather and compare information for daily use.

The Entertainment Business engages in the planning, development and operation of game and tool applications primarily for smart devices.

The E-Commerce Business engages in the planning, development and operation of an online bicycle store under the name "cyma".

Mainly advertise on radio commercial.

Prefixed Serif of “Ateam of time” at the beginning of commercial is characterized.

Re-listed on the First Section of the Tokyo Stock Exchange (TSE) 233 days after TSE Mothers listing on April 4, 2012, and is considered the fastest re-listing ever.

History
2018
February: Opened a studio in Fukuoka as a development site in the area
2017
December: Acquired Increments Inc. as a wholly owned subsidiary of Ateam Inc.
2016
December: Established Ateam Vietnam Co., Ltd. as a subsidiary of Ateam Inc.
2015
December: Headquarters transferred to Nakamura Ward in Nagoya
September: Opened a studio in Tokyo as a development site in the area
September: Dissolved capital alliance with NHN Entertainment and liquidated joint venture company Ateam NHN Entertainment Corporation
2014
January: Established Joint Venture Company Ateam NHN Entertainment with NHN Entertainment Corporation 
2013
December: Development collaboration with NHN Entertainment Corporation  
August: Established Hikkoshi Samurai Inc., A.T.Support Inc., Ateam Lifestyle Inc. as subsidiaries of Ateam Inc.
February: Established A.T.brides Inc. as a subsidiary of Ateam Inc.
2012
November: Re-listed on the First Section of the Tokyo Stock Exchange
September: Opened a studio in Osaka as a development site in the area
April: Listed on the Tokyo Stock Exchange Mothers
2011
August: Business tie-up with GREE, Inc.
2010
July: Release of Ateam's first Android application
July: Commencement of women's health consultation service “LaLune”
2009
August: Release of Ateam's first social application
2008
December: Distribution of Ateam's first game for Nintendo's WiiWare begins
October: Release of Ateam's first application for smartphone
October: Launch of short-notice wedding hall booking service “Sugukon Navi”
September: Acquisition of JISA/JIPDEC Privacy Mark
2007
September: Launch of online used car appraisal service “Navikuru”
February: Headquarters transferred to Nagoya Lucent Tower
2006
September: Release of the first MMORPG “Eternal Zone”for KDDI CORPORATION EZ web application (BREW)
June: Launch of Ateam’s first Lifestyle Support service “Hikkoshi Samurai”, a Moving company search service
2004
November: Organizational change to joint stock corporation
2003
December: Began operating official websites for mobile phones
2000
February: Ateam Ltd. Established in Tajimi, Gifu Prefecture
1997
June: Takao Hayashi gets his first contract as freelance software developer in Toki City, Gifu

Subsidiaries
Ateam Brides Inc.
Ateam Hikkoshi Samurai Inc.
Ateam Lifestyle Inc.
Ateam Connect Inc.
Ateam Vietnam Co., Ltd.
Increments Inc.

Business
Entertainment
Lifestyle Support
E-Commerce

Content Guidelines

Smartphone Game Applications
BASSA WARRIORS
Valkyrie Connect
Unison League
Derby Impact
War of Legions
Dark Summoner
Eternal Zone
Million Versus
Mahjong -Rising
Murder Room
Prison Breaking Girl-Lie
Shōjo Kageki Revue Starlight Re:LIVE
Sangoku Taisen Smash!

Other Mobile Contents
［+］HOME (for Android)
［+］icon (for iOS)
zero app
　 └Good Night's Sleep Alarm<br/ >
　 └Quick Calorie Control

Internet Service
Hikkoshi Samurai (Moving company search service)
Navikuru (Online used car appraisal service)
Hanayume (Short-notice wedding hall booking service)
Navi Navi Cashing (Comprehensive Card Loan service)
LaLune (Women's health consultation service)

References

External links
 

Japanese companies established in 1997
Video game companies established in 1997
Video game companies of Japan
Video game development companies
Software companies of Japan
Amusement companies of Japan
Companies based in Nagoya
Mobile game companies